Ninglang Yi Autonomous County is located in the northwest of Yunnan province, China, bordering Sichuan province to the northeast. It is under the administration of Lijiang City. The county is home to the Mosuo people, who lived under the quasi-independent Chiefdom of Yongning until abolished in 1956. Ninglang Luguhu Airport is located in the county.

Administrative divisions
Ninglang Yi Autonomous County has 4 towns, 10 townships and 1 ethnic township. 
4 towns

10 townships

1 ethnic township
 Cuiyu Lisu and Pumi

Climate

References

External links
Ninglang County Official Website
Lijiang City Official Site

 
County-level divisions of Lijiang
Yi autonomous counties